This is a list of butterflies of Niger. About 54 species are known from Niger, none of which are endemic.

Papilionidae

Papilioninae

Papilionini
Papilio demodocus Esper, [1798]

Leptocercini
Graphium angolanus baronis (Ungemach, 1932)

Pieridae

Coliadinae
Eurema brigitta (Stoll, [1780])
Eurema hecabe solifera (Butler, 1875)
Catopsilia florella (Fabricius, 1775)

Pierinae
Colotis amata calais (Cramer, 1775)
Colotis antevippe (Boisduval, 1836)
Colotis celimene angusi Rothschild, 1921
Colotis celimene sudanicus (Aurivillius, 1905)
Colotis chrysonome (Klug, 1829)
Colotis danae eupompe (Klug, 1829)
Colotis evagore antigone (Boisduval, 1836)
Colotis halimede (Klug, 1829)
Colotis liagore (Klug, 1829)
Colotis phisadia (Godart, 1819)
Pinacopterix eriphia tritogenia (Klug, 1829)
Nepheronia buquetii (Boisduval, 1836)

Pierini
Appias epaphia (Cramer, [1779])
Pontia daplidice (Linnaeus, 1758)
Pontia glauconome Klug, 1829
Belenois aurota (Fabricius, 1793)
Belenois creona (Cramer, [1776])
Belenois gidica (Godart, 1819)

Lycaenidae

Aphnaeinae
Cigaritis nilus (Hewitson, 1865)
Zeritis neriene Boisduval, 1836
Axiocerses amanga borealis Aurivillius, 1905

Theclinae
Iolaus alienus bicaudatus Aurivillius, 1905
Iolaus sudanicus Aurivillius, 1905

Polyommatinae

Lycaenesthini
Anthene princeps (Butler, 1876)

Polyommatini
Leptotes pirithous (Linnaeus, 1767)
Leptotes pulchra (Murray, 1874)
Tarucus balkanicus (Freyer, 1843)
Tarucus legrasi Stempffer, 1948
Tarucus rosacea (Austaut, 1885)
Tarucus theophrastus (Fabricius, 1793)
Zizeeria knysna (Trimen, 1862)
Azanus ubaldus (Stoll, 1782)
Euchrysops nilotica (Aurivillius, 1904)
Chilades eleusis (Demaison, 1888)
Lepidochrysops polydialecta (Bethune-Baker, [1923])

Nymphalidae

Danainae

Danaini
Danaus chrysippus alcippus (Cramer, 1777)

Satyrinae

Melanitini
Melanitis libya Distant, 1882

Satyrini
Ypthima condamini nigeriae Kielland, 1982

Charaxinae

Charaxini
Charaxes jasius Poulton, 1926
Charaxes epijasius Reiche, 1850
Charaxes legeri Plantrou, 1978

Nymphalinae

Nymphalini
Junonia oenone (Linnaeus, 1758)
Junonia orithya madagascariensis Guenée, 1865
Hypolimnas misippus (Linnaeus, 1764)

Limenitinae

Adoliadini
Hamanumida daedalus (Fabricius, 1775)

Heliconiinae

Acraeini
Acraea neobule Doubleday, 1847

Hesperiidae

Coeliadinae
Coeliades forestan (Stoll, [1782])

Pyrginae

Celaenorrhinini
Sarangesa phidyle (Walker, 1870)

Carcharodini
Spialia spio (Linnaeus, 1764)

Hesperiinae

Aeromachini
Platylesches chamaeleon (Mabille, 1891)

See also
List of moths of Niger
Wildlife of Niger

References

Seitz, A. Die Gross-Schmetterlinge der Erde 13: Die Afrikanischen Tagfalter. Plates
Seitz, A. Die Gross-Schmetterlinge der Erde 13: Die Afrikanischen Tagfalter. Text 

Niger

Niger
Niger
Butterflies